Francesco III Gattilusio was a Lord of Thasos. He was a son of Dorino I of Lesbos and wife Orietta Doria.

He married his cousin Gattilusio, daughter of his uncle Palamede of Ainos and wife Valentina N, without issue.

References
 

Francesco 03
Year of birth unknown
Year of death unknown
Thasos
15th-century Genoese people